Events from the year 1730 in the Dutch Republic

Events

 - Utrecht sodomy trials

Births

Deaths

References

1730 in the Dutch Republic
1730s in the Dutch Republic
Years of the 18th century in the Dutch Republic